In enzymology, a chlorophenol O-methyltransferase is an enzyme that catalyzes the chemical reaction

S-adenosyl-L-methionine + trichlorophenol  S-adenosyl-L-homocysteine + trichloroanisole

Thus, the two substrates of this enzyme are S-adenosyl methionine and trichlorophenol, whereas its two products are S-adenosylhomocysteine and trichloroanisole.

This enzyme belongs to the family of transferases, specifically those transferring one-carbon group methyltransferases.  The systematic name of this enzyme class is S-adenosyl-L-methionine:trichlorophenol O-methyltransferase. Other names in common use include halogenated phenol O-methyltransferase, trichlorophenol, and O-methyltransferase.

References

 

EC 2.1.1
Enzymes of unknown structure